The Houses of Parliament Act 1837 (1 & 2 Vict. c. 7) was an Act of Parliament in the United Kingdom, signed into law on 23 December 1837. It made a number of miscellaneous provisions to give the Commissioners of Woods, Forests, Land Revenues, Works and Buildings power to purchase land and buildings necessary to prepare the site for the reconstruction of the Palace of Westminster.

References
The British almanac of the Society for the Diffusion of Useful Knowledge, for the year 1839. The Society for the Diffusion of Useful Knowledge, London, 1839.

1837 in British law
United Kingdom Acts of Parliament 1837
Palace of Westminster